Topdalsfjorden or Tofdalsfjorden is a fjord in the municipality of Kristiansand in Agder county, Norway. The river Topdalselva empties into the fjord at the eastern side just south of the Kristiansand Airport, Kjevik. The European route E18 highway crosses the fjord on the Varodd Bridge.

References

Fjords of Agder
Geography of Kristiansand